The 2007 TSC Stores Tankard was held February 12–18 at the Sarnia Sports and Entertainment Centre in Sarnia.

Teams

Standings

Playoffs

Sources
2007 TSC Stores Tankard Coverage on CurlingZone.com

Tsc Stores Tankard, 2007
Ontario Tankard
Sport in Sarnia
2007 in Ontario